The Silverudd Blue, is a Swedish breed of chicken. It was developed by Martin Silverudd in Småland, in southern Sweden. Hens lay blue/green eggs, weighing . The flock-book for the breed is kept by the Svenska Kulturhönsföreningen – the Swedish Cultural Hen Association.

History 

The Silvered Blue was developed by Martin Silverudd in Småland, in southern Sweden. It derived principally from imported New Hampshire and Rhode Island Red stock; the blue egg shell came from cross-breeding with Cream Legbar birds from the United Kingdom.

When Silverudd died in 1986, the development of the breed was incomplete, so modern examples vary in size, egg shell color, and body size.

Characteristics 

The Silverudd Blue is a medium-sized chicken.

As in other blue chicken breeds, three colours occur in accordance with the frequency of the dilution gene: black, blue and splashed white, in Mendelian proportion (1:2:1). Black birds are born black with some lighter areas, blue birds are born grey, and splashed-white birds are born yellow.

The outline of the body is square. In cock birds the tail is arched, while in hens it is triangular and dense. The comb is single. The birds are four-toed, with dark legs tending towards black; the beak is dark.

References 

Chicken breeds
Chicken breeds originating in Sweden